Creighton Stadium was an outdoor American football stadium in the midwestern United States, located on the campus of Creighton University in Omaha, Nebraska. At the southeast corner of North 27th and Burt streets, it was the home field of the Creighton Bluejays of the Missouri Valley Conference.

Constructed in 1924, and opened  in 1925, it was a concrete stadium in the shape of an oval, but lacked enclosed end zones. Asymmetric, the larger grandstand on the south sideline was single level and included the press box, while the north grandstand had a second deck, bounded by Burt Street. After several seasons, lights were added, between the field and the running track.

Located at the northwest corner of campus, the present-day North Freeway (U.S. Route 75) is immediately west of the site.

Like many colleges during World War II, Creighton put its football program on hiatus after the 1942 season; the final varsity game was at home against Tulsa on November 21. Bluejay football was not resumed after the war, but the stadium was used for track competitions and ROTC drilling for the next two decades. It was demolished in the 1960s and the site where it stood is now occupied by the Criss research buildings of the Creighton University School of Medicine.

In addition to college athletics, the stadium hosted religious and community affairs, as well as rodeos.

References

External links
 Creighton University Archives – stadium photos

Defunct college football venues
Creighton Bluejays football
Defunct sports venues in Nebraska
Sports venues in Omaha, Nebraska